Abraham "Abe" Perry (1842-1908) was an American thoroughbred horse trainer born in Midway, Kentucky best remembered as the winner of the 1885 Kentucky Derby with Joe Cotton. He was the first African-American trainer of a classic race winner to be mentioned in post-race reports.

Racing career
Abe Perry began his career training for Gen. Abraham Buford at his Bosque Bonita breeding farm in Woodford County, Kentucky. From 1876 through 1878 he conditioned the colt McWhirter to several stakes race wins. He ran fifth to Baden-Baden in the May 22, 1877 Kentucky Derby but came back less than a week later to defeat Baden-Baden in the May 28 Clark Handicap at Churchill Downs. 

Among his other wins with Joe Cotton, in 1885 Abe Perry won the important Tennessee Derby in Nashville and Coney Island Derby at the Sheepshead Bay Race Track in Brooklyn, New York. 

Perry is buried in African Cemetery No. 2 in Lexington, Kentucky.

References

External links
McWhirter (1874)
African Americans in Racing

1842 births
1908 deaths
African-American people
American horse trainers
People from Midway, Kentucky